Nicolas Cadi (born on 29 June 1861 in Damascus, Syria - died in 1941) was Archbishop of the Melkite Greek Catholic Archeparchy of Bosra and Hauran in Syria.

Life

Nicolas Cadi was ordained priest on 21 November 1884. He was appointed on 10 February 1889 successor of Basil Haggiar as Archbishop of Bosra and Hauran and consecrated a bishop on the same day. On 16 November 1939 Cadi resigned and became Professor Emeritus at the same time appointed Titular Archbishop of Mocissus. Until his death in 1941 he was Archbishop Emeritus, and was co-consecrator of Archbishop Etienne Soukkarie. He was succeeded by Archbishop Pierre Chami SMSP after his death in 1941.

References

External links
 http://www.catholic-hierarchy.org/bishop/bcadin.html

1861 births
1941 deaths
Melkite Greek Catholic bishops
Syrian archbishops
Eastern Catholic bishops in Syria